Pseudoprocris is a genus of moths of the family Zygaenidae.

Species
 Pseudoprocris dolosa H. Druce, 1884
 Pseudoprocris gracilis H. Druce, 1884

References
 

Procridinae
Zygaenidae genera